Dead Hand was a Soviet weapons-control system during the Cold War.

Dead Hand may also refer to:

The Dead Hand, 2009 book by David E. Hoffman
Dead Hand, or Mortmain, the perpetual, inalienable ownership of real estate
The "Dead Hand" series, books by Upton Sinclair starting with The Profits of Religion
"The Dead Hand", later retitled "The General", a 1945 short story by Isaac Asimov later included in Foundation and Empire
"Dead Hand" (The Americans), a 2018 episode of the TV series The Americans

See also
Dead man's hand (disambiguation)